The Cachantún Cup is a women's tennis tournament that was held at the Centro de Tenis Las Salinas, at the Club Naval de Campo Las Salinas in Viña del Mar, Chile. The tournament was competed once, in 2008, from February 11 to February 17.

Past finals

Singles

Doubles

See also
List of tennis tournaments

External links
Profile WTA Tour profile

Tennis tournaments in Chile
Clay court tennis tournaments
WTA Tour